The 2017–18 South Florida Bulls women's basketball team will represent the University of South Florida in the 2017–18 NCAA Division I women's basketball season. The Bulls, coached by Jose Fernandez in his eighteenth season, play their home games at the USF Sun Dome in Tampa, Florida. This will be USF's fifth season as a member of the American Athletic Conference, known as The American or AAC. They finished the season 26–8, 13–3 in AAC play to finish in second place. They advanced to the championship game of the American Athletic Conference women's tournament for the fourth year in a row, where they lost to Connecticut for the fourth time. They received at-large bid to the NCAA women's tournament where they got upset by Buffalo in the first round.

Media
All Bulls games will air on Bullscast Radio or CBS 1010 AM. Conference home games will rotate between ESPN3, AAC Digital, and Bullscast. Road games will typically be streamed on the opponents website, though conference road games could also appear on ESPN3 or AAC Digital.

Roster

Schedule

|-
!colspan=9 style="background:#006747; color:#CFC493;"| Regular season

|-
!colspan=12 style="background:#006747;"|AAC Women's Tournament

|-
!colspan=12 style="background:#006747;"|NCAA Women's Tournament

Rankings

See also
2017–18 South Florida Bulls men's basketball team

References

South Florida Bulls women's basketball seasons
South Florida
South Florida